The Fort Alice is a fort in Sri Aman, Sarawak, Malaysia.

Name 
The fort was named after Margaret Alice Lili de Windt, wife of Charles Brooke.

History 
The fort was originally constructed in 1864 as the Simanggang Fort after the victory of Charles Brook over Rentap. The fort was listed as historical monument by the Sarawak State Government in 1971. In June 2013, restoration works began on the fort and was completed on 18 April 2015 with a cost of MYR5 million. It was then reopened as the Sri Aman Heritage Museum.

~ Old tradition in Fort Alice (1864-1964) 

This was the evening call at eight
o'clock for hundred year, when the Resident used to have his dinner and the draw-
bridge was drawn up for the night. It was a call made by a policeman
after he had struck the eight o'clock gong.

The call was changed slightly twice over the years but
the meaning remained almost the same.

The Call (in Iban)

Oh Ha! Oh Ha! Oh Ha!

Jam diatu pukol lapan,

Tangga udah di-tarit,

Pintu udah di-tambit,

Orang ari ulu,

Orang ari ili,

Nadai tahu niki kubu agi.

Translation

Oh Ha! Oh Ha! Oh Ha!

The time is now eight o'clock,

The steps have been drawn up,

The door is closed.

People from up-river,

People from down-river,

Are not allowed to come up to the fort any more.

Architecture 
The rectangular fort was built on a hilltop. It is equipped with cannons, open courtyard, drawbridge and lookout tower.

See also 
 List of tourist attractions in Malaysia

References 

Buildings and structures in Sarawak
1864 establishments in Sarawak
Alice
Museums in Sarawak
Sri Aman District
19th-century architecture in Malaysia